Briston is a village, civil parish and electoral ward  in the English county of Norfolk that contains the hamlet of Briston Common. The village is situated on the route of the B1354 that runs between the A148 at Thursford and the B1149 at Saxthorpe.

History
Briston's name is of Anglo-Saxon origin and derives from the Old English for a settlement or farmstead near to a landslip.

In the Domesday Book, Briston is recorded as consisting of 22 settlements. The principal landowners were William the Conqueror and William de Warenne who owned  of land from which had been previously the property of Toke, a Saxon Thegn who had been evicted after the defeat of the Harold Godwinson at the Battle of Hastings. This land was farmed by three Free Men or Socman and a further  was farmed by fourteen bordars. There was a pannage or woodland for 20 pigs which was valued at 16 shillings.

On the 17 August 1941, a Vickers Wellington of No. 12 Squadron RAF crashed close to the village killing three crewmembers. A brass plaque commemorating their deaths is located in All Saint's Church and lists the following:
 Pilot-Officer Bernard M. J. Vincent (d.1941) of Yeovil, Somerset
 Flight-Sergeant Edward H. Nancarrow (1915-1941) of Portsmouth, Hampshire
 Flight-Sergeant Colin G. C. Frost (1920-1941) of Polesworth, Warwickshire

Geography
The civil parish had in 2001 census, a population of 2,021, increasing to 2,439 at the 2011 Census. For the purposes of local government, the parish falls within the district of North Norfolk.

Transport
The nearest railway station is at Sheringham for the Bittern Line which runs between Sheringham, Cromer and Norwich but a steam line is also available from Holt to Sheringham.  The nearest airport is Norwich International Airport.

Village amenities

Within the village there is a bakery, two butcher's shops, a fishmonger, a grocer's, a small plant nursery, an antique shop, a Post Office and a garage.

Astley Primary School is located in the village whilst secondary school students usually attend Reepham High School and College. 

'The Pavilion' (a local community facility) hosts a Youth Club and monthly film shows. Furthermore, the village has a playing field with tennis courts, playing fields , a skate park, a bowling green and a playground for the children of the village. 

There are two public houses in the village. On the outskirts of the village is the Three Horseshoes, a 16th-century gastropub with open log fire and oak beams that has undergone large scale refurbishment.  In the centre of the village is the recently closed Green Man pub, which has now re-opened as the Explorers Bar.

All Saints' Church
All Saints' Church is unusual for Norfolk because it has no remaining church tower, the original tower having collapsed in 1785. The church is largely decorated in a Fourteenth Century style and the chancel was erected in 1875 in the memory of a former rector of the church, Reverend Charles Norris. Furthermore, the church holds a curious metal cello which was created by the village blacksmith in the Eighteenth Century.

War Memorial
Briston's War Memorial takes the form of a stone cross and is located in All Saints' Churchyard. It lists the following names for the First World War:
 Corporal Herbert G. Whittred (1897-1916), 30th Company, Machine Gun Corps
 Corporal Herbert J. Scott (d.1918), 12th Battalion, Royal Norfolk Regiment
 Lance-Corporal Percy J. Smith MM (1894-1917), 20th Company, Machine Gun Corps
 Lance-Corporal Charles W. Partridge (d.1915), 1st Battalion, Royal Norfolk Regiment
 Driver Richard W. Harrison (1897-1918), 409th Battery, Royal Field Artillery
 Private Percy L. Arnold (1885-1918), att. 479th (Siege) Battery, Royal Army Service Corps
 Private Martin Scott (1898-1917), 8th Battalion, East Surrey Regiment
 Private William C. Sands (1887-1917), 13th Battalion, Essex Regiment
 Private Charles C. Ives (1882-1918), 4th Battalion, Royal Fusiliers
 Private Herbert Y. Ward (1892-1918), 2nd Battalion, Loyal Regiment (North Lancashire)
 Private Henry C. Grint (1893-1916), 1st Battalion, Royal Norfolk Regiment
 Private Frederick C. Partridge (1884-1916), 1st Battalion, Royal Norfolk Regiment
 Private Harry Fox (1896-1916), 2nd Battalion, Royal Norfolk Regiment
 Private J. Walter Gascoigne (d.1916), 2nd Battalion, Royal Norfolk Regiment
 Private Arthur Rudd (d.1917), 1/4th Battalion, Royal Norfolk Regiment
 Private Hubert E. Attoe (1896-1915), 1/5th Battalion, Royal Norfolk Regiment
 Private Louis E. B. Buckley (1893-1915), 1/5th Battalion, Royal Norfolk Regiment
 Private John Dewing (1898-1917), 1/5th Battalion, Royal Norfolk Regiment
 Private Cecil Lambert (d.1918), 7th Battalion, Royal Norfolk Regiment
 Private Robert Stearman (d.1918), 7th Battalion, Royal Norfolk Regiment
 Private George S. Griffiths (1896-1915), 9th Battalion, Royal Norfolk Regiment
 Private J. Thomas Attoe (d.1918), 1st Battalion, Sherwood Foresters
 Private Richard T. Griffiths (d.1917), 12th Battalion, Suffolk Regiment
 Private James H. Barwick (1893-1917), 21st Battalion, Royal Welch Fusiliers
 James Fox

And, the following for the Second World War:
 Able-Seaman Herbert S. Crowe (1924-1945), H.M.M.L. 1226
 Lance-Corporal Charles W. Perry (1920-1944), 5th Battalion, Royal Norfolk Regiment
 Private Frederick E. J. Craske (1920-1940), 2nd Battalion, Royal Norfolk Regiment
 Private Frederick J. Partridge (1917-1943), 6th Battalion, Royal Norfolk Regiment
 James E. Brown
 Reginald Smith
 William Wright

References

External links

Villages in Norfolk
Civil parishes in Norfolk
North Norfolk